Tard-Venus (French, "latecomers") were medieval groups of routiers (mercentaries or bandits) that ravaged Europe in the later years of the reign of King John II of France.

History
When the Treaty of Brétigny was signed May 8, 1360, the peace that resulted left many soldiers and those who provided services to the armies without employment. While the King of England evacuated his forces from France and paid them. Some captains of the garrisons, knights and squires left to find employment as mercenaries for the King of Navarre. Additionally the German mercenaries, as well as mercenaries and adventurers from Brabant, Gascony, Flanders, Hainault, Breton and France  were left to fend for themselves.  Dismissed, they formed bands and began to pillage.

In Champagne, they captured the castle of Joinville, seizing a considerable amount of booty for ransom. They roamed and looted the Champagne region and devastate the bishoprics of Langres, Toul and Verdun then penetrated Burgundy supported by some Burgundian knights and squires.

After settling around Besançon, Dijon and Beaune, they took and plundered Vergy, Gevrey-in-Beaune and ravaged the region.

In all there may have been 15,000 men in these groups. The most powerful captains included:
 Seguin Badefol,  at the head of 2,000 mercenaries
 Talbart Talbardon
 Guiot du Pin
 Frank Hennequin
 Camus Bour 
 Bour Lesparre
 Bour Breteuil
 Naudon of Bageran
 Lamit
 Hagre of 'Escot
 Ourri the German
 Bernard de la Salle
 Robert Briquet
 Amanieu Ortigue Garciot Castel
 Guyonnet Pau
 Bascot de Mauléon
 Petit Meschin

In mid-Lent all these groups turned towards the rich papal city of Avignon attacking the county of Macon, Lyon and Forez on the way. They occupied the priory of Estivareilles.

After their victory, the bands turned to looting the district. Seguin Badefol, with 3000 fighters, took hostages for ransom in Macon County. Other gang leaders such as Naudon de Bageran, Espiote, Creswey Robert Briquet, and Camus bour, marched on Avignon to kidnap the Pope and cardinals.

But on 3 June 1362, this army was cut to pieces by 400 Spaniards and Castilians soldiers under the orders of Henry of Trastamara at Montpensier.  Learning  of that defeat the other bands fled to the  fortress of Pont-Saint-Esprit, where they found immense wealth and occupied a strategic crossroads. At the news of the capture of Pont-Saint-Esprit, many bands in Champagne moved into the Rhone valley.

With starvation beginning to take in Avignon, Pope Innocent VI preached a crusade against the robbers, but failing to pay these Crusaders many returned home, but some joined the ranks of the bandits.

The complete failure of the crusade forced Innocent VI to give to French King John II, 60,000 gold florins to pay off the brigands and take them to Italy. Key leaders of the band enlist to serve Galeazzo II Visconti and Bernabo Visconti, lords of Milan.

Seguin Badefol holding the city of Anse, refused to go to Italy and continued to pillage for more than a year before retiring with his treasures to Gascony, his native country. Later he served Charles II of Navarre, where he died by poison figs.

References

Mercenary units and formations of the Middle Ages